Kong Hon (September 10, 1939 – December 7, 2017) is a former Chinese actor and director from Hong Kong. Mr Kong is credited with over 90 films as an actor and 2 films as a director.

Career 
Kong made his acting debut at an early age and subsequently appeared in many films. In 1979, he joined Rediffusion Television and acted in dramas, including Blowing in the Wind, The Eight Fairies and Empress Wu.
He later appeared in several TVB productions from the 1990s, and was noted for portraying wealthy figures in series such as Healing Hands and Burning Flame.

Kong's final role was in the 2012 series Three Kingdoms RPG.

Filmography
 Films 
 1950 Fury in Their Hearts 
 1967 Confused Love
 1967 The Divorce Brinkmanship 
 2006 My Name Is Fame - Fai's father.  

 Television series Empress Wu (1984)Detective Investigation Files II (1995)Eternal Happiness (2002)Vigilante Force (2003)Lady Fan (2004)Women on the Run (2005)Revolving Doors of Vengeance (2005)La Femme Desperado (2006)Burning Flame III (2009)Born Rich (2009)A Great Way to Care (2011–13)Three Kingdoms RPG'' (2012)

Personal life 
Kong's wife was Wong Siu-yin, an actress. They had two children.  Their son, Jeffrey Cheung, is a former professional footballer.

On 7 December 2017, Kong died at the Hong Kong Sanatorium & Hospital in Hong Kong. He was 78 years old.

References

External links

1939 births
2017 deaths
People from Liaoyang
20th-century Hong Kong male actors
21st-century Hong Kong male actors
Hong Kong male television actors
Hong Kong male film actors
TVB veteran actors